Fire 000 is an Australian observational documentary series that is now airing on the Nine Network on 7 May 2008.

Fire 000 follows the fire officer operations of the New South Wales Fire Brigade.

References

Nine Network original programming
2008 Australian television series debuts
2008 Australian television series endings
Australian factual television series